Daniel Andrés Luna García (born 7 May 2003) is a Colombian professional footballer who plays as an attacking midfielder for Spanish club RCD Mallorca, on loan from Deportivo Cali.

Club career
Born in Cali, Luna joined his hometown side Deportivo Cali's youth setup in 2015, and was promoted to the first team ahead of the 2021 season. He made his first team – and Categoría Primera A – debut on 29 January 2021, coming on as a late substitute for Darwin Andrade in a 1–1 home draw against Envigado.

Luna scored his first professional goal on 11 December 2021, netting his team's second in a 2–0 home win over Atlético Junior. After finishing the 2021 season with one goal in 19 appearances, he contributed with four goals during the 2022 campaign, also playing in the Copa Libertadores.

On 11 January 2023, amidst interest from Spanish La Liga side Mallorca, Deportivo Cali released a statement to clarify that the transfer "was not confirmed". Late in the month, however, Mallorca announced the loan of Luna, with a buyout clause.

References

External links

2003 births
Living people
Colombian footballers
Footballers from Cali
Association football midfielders
Colombia youth international footballers
Categoría Primera A players
Deportivo Cali footballers
RCD Mallorca players
Colombian expatriate footballers
Colombian expatriate sportspeople in Spain
Expatriate footballers in Spain